Vigilance is a third-person shooter developed by Postlinear Entertainment and Any Channel and released by SegaSoft in 1998 for the PC.

Plot 

The single player campaign followed eight agents working for the counter-terrorist organization SION (Special Intelligence Operations Network).

Gameplay

The game combines first and third person perspective, allowing the player to control one of eight SION agents each with varied strengths and weaknesses. Aside from the basic single player mode, it also came with a support of play over LAN and Heat.net.

Characters
Alexander "Bishop" Blair - Bishop, a 38-year-old British-American, is an expert assassin. Although weak in combat, his stealth and sneaking abilities make him more than capable to handle most situations required of him. When not on missions, Bishop often wears expensive clothing and tailored jackets. His skills are assassination, communications, demolitions, medical, stealth and tactics, while his specialties are stealth and assassination.
Nicole "Nikki" "Duchess" Davinova - Nikki is a 32-year-old Russian who specialized in stealth and reconnaissance. Although her reconnaissance is limited to 50 feet, it is still good enough so that, when coupled with her sneaking abilities, she can avoid most confrontations. This is good for her because she does not last long in battle. She is skilled in computers, repair, medical, high tech weapons, security systems and communications.
John "Bluto" Blutanski - In his 29 years of life, Bluto has become a tough man. His heavy drinking and countless injuries have taken a toll on the brute, however. The tradeoff is that he can carry more equipment without slowing down. His specializations in demolitions and strength and stamina reflect the type of personality he has: there is not any problem that cannot be killed. Bluto's preferred attack method is to spray the room with bullets, and he is skilled in demolition, assassination, melee, thrown weapons and repair.
Damen "Demon" Rush - Demon is quite different from his fellow American, Bluto. While Bluto prefers to use explosives and heavy weapons to accomplish all of his goals, Demon is skilled in all forms of combat. He is very versatile in the field, and he can maintain a fast pace with almost twice his weight in equipment. He specializes in reconnaissance, and is able to detect enemies within 50 feet of him. He is also able to carry twice the amount of ammo with him. His skills include demolitions, repair, medical, security systems, stealth and reconnaissance.
Tasmin "Fury" Leandri - Fury started her life 23 years ago in France. By the time she was 12 she was a petty criminal on the streets of Marseille. Lives became cheap to her, and she became a slightly loose cannon. Still, however, she is efficient, and she is in superb physical health. Aside from specializing in assassination and strength and stamina, she is skilled in assassination, demolition, melee, stealth, reconnaissance and thrown weapons.
Scott "Hex" Maxwell - Hex is not a typical computer geek. Although he has been hacking since he was ten, he is also extremely fast. His sense of style has him wearing Kevlar Vests, granting him bonus armor. The 22-year-old specializes in armor and speed, which serves as a good complement to his skills in computers, security systems, hi-tech weapons, repair and communications. Hex is weak and will not last too long in combat, however.
Amy "Kestrel" Leong - Kestrel's nickname comes from a small and fast bird of prey. She was given this by members of the Hong Kong SWAT team. When she joined, she was the only woman on the team, and she was constantly harassed. However, her prowess with long range weaponry soon earned her the respect of her peers. She specializes in sniping and is also able to carry three halves the amount of ammo that others can carry, giving her more opportunities to dispatch her enemies "like clockwork." She is skilled in assassination, stealth, security systems and reconnaissance.
Lorenzo "Viper" Menez - At the age of 50 years, Viper is, by far, the senior member of the team. He fanatically supports SION's goals, perhaps because of the countless battles he has fought for it. Although his age slows him down, he is still strong in battle. His specialization in reconnaissance for 100 feet allows him the ability to prepare for any threats he may encounter. Just in case that fails, he wears extra armor. He is skilled in thrown weapons, reconnaissance, medical, repair, demolitions, stealth and melee.

Development

The project took over two years and $2 million to create. The game was SegaSoft's first venture into 3D shooters. It runs on the AnyWorld game engine, which was designed by AnyChannel. The designs for the player characters were intentionally generic and familiar, since the developers felt that when playing an action-based game on the Internet, gamers would want to immediately understand their selection of characters so that they could jump right in. The environments were created with off-the-shelf 3D software such as 3D Studio Max.

The developers intended to make stealth a major aspect of the game, designing certain areas to be too difficult for players to fight their way through.

Reception

Vigilance was mostly met with mixed reviews. While GameSpot complained largely on slow access times requiring heavy resources from computers, the gameplay was praised for large variety of weapons at the time and moderately sized levels; the game was given a final score of 5/10. A review by GamePro gave the game 3.5 stars out of 5, praising the games creative and feature-rich, but criticized oversights and annoyances, mentioning the game required more play testing.

References

External links

1998 video games
First-person shooters
Sega video games
Third-person shooters
Video games about terrorism
Video games scored by Jack Wall
Video games developed in the United States
Windows games
Windows-only games